William Anderson Black,  (October 9, 1847 – September 1, 1934) was a Canadian politician. He is the oldest person ever elected to the House of Commons of Canada, 76 years, 1 month, 26 days when he was first elected. He was 83 when he last won election and he died in office.

He was born in Windsor, Nova Scotia, the son of Samuel Gay Black and Sophia Wright. In 1875, with Robert Pickford, Black founded Pickford and Black, a company that supplied ship's provisions. The company expanded into shipping passengers and freight as well as trading in the West Indies. He represented Halifax County in the Nova Scotia House of Assembly from 1894 to 1897. In 1922, he was a co-founder of the Maritime Life Assurance Company. Black was first elected to the House of Commons of Canada for the riding of Halifax in a 1923 by-election. A Conservative, he was re-elected in 1925, 1926, and 1930. In 1926, he was the Minister of Marine and Fisheries (Acting) and Minister of Railways and Canals in the short lived cabinet of Arthur Meighen.

Black also served as president of Eastern Canada Savings and Loan and was a director for the Royal Bank. He married Annie Bell and had five children. In 1924, he established a chair of commerce at Dalhousie University.

Electoral record

References

External links
 

1847 births
1934 deaths
People from Windsor, Nova Scotia
Conservative Party of Canada (1867–1942) MPs
Canadian Ministers of Railways and Canals
Members of the House of Commons of Canada from Nova Scotia
Members of the King's Privy Council for Canada
Progressive Conservative Association of Nova Scotia MLAs